Robert Joseph Hermann (born August 12, 1934) is an American prelate of the Roman Catholic Church.  He served as an auxiliary bishop of the Archdiocese of St. Louis in Missouri from 2002 to 2010.

Biography

Early life 
Robert Hermann was born on August 12, 1934, in Weingarten, Missouri.  As a child, he was a member of Our Lady Help of Christians Parish in Weingarten.  He entered  St. Preparatory Seminary in St. Louis, Missouri, in 1955, followed by Kenrick Seminary in St. Louis in 1963.  Hermann graduated with a Bachelor of Philosophy degree from Cardinal Glennon College in St. Louis.

Priesthood 
Hermann was ordained into the priesthood by Cardinal Joseph Ritter for the Archdiocese of Saint Louis on March 30, 1963.  After his ordination, Hermann had the following part time assignments in parishes in Eastern Missouri while teaching in church schools:

 Assistant pastor, Our Lady Help of Christians in Bonnots Mill, Missouri, in 1963
 Assistant pastor, St. Catherine of Siena in Pagedale, Missouri from 1963 to 1964 
 Assistant pastor, St. Cronan in St. Louis from 1964 to 1968 (during this period, he studied at St. Louis University, receiving a Bachelor of Arts degree in English in 1966)
 Associate pastor, Holy Ghost in Berkeley, Missouri from 1968 to 1972 
 Associate pastor. Holy Cross in Baden, Missouri, from 1972 to 1976
 Associate pastor, Most Holy Trinity in St. Louis from 1976 to 1979

In 1979, Hermann was appointed director of the Catholic Charismatic Renewal for the archdiocese, serving in that role until 1982.  During the same period, he served as associate pastor of St. Pius X Parish in Glasgow Village, Missouri.  In 1982, Hermann was named supervisor of the Acolyte Internship Program for Kenrick Seminary and as pastor of St. Andrew Parish in Lemay, Missouri.  Hermann left St. Andrew in 1988 to become pastor of Incarnate Word Parish in Chesterfield, Missouri, serving there until 2002. 

In 1996, Hermann was named as dean of the Northwest Deanery in the archdiocese. He became chair of the Agency Review Task Force in 2000.  He was appointed as vicar general in 2002.

Auxiliary Bishop of St. Louis 
Hermann was appointed by Pope John Paul II on October 16, 2002, as an auxiliary bishop of the Archdiocese of Saint Louis.  He was consecrated on December 12, 2002, by Archbishop Justin Rigali.

The archdiocesan consultors elected Hermann as archdiocesan administrator until April 21, 2009, when Bishop Robert Carlson was named archbishop and led the archdiocese as apostolic administrator in concert with Archbishop-elect Carlson until his installation on June 10, 2009. Hermann supervised the parishes in five deaneries: Northeast St. Louis County, Northwest St. Louis County, Festus, St. Charles County and Washington. His responsibilities also included Catholic education, stewardship and development, and several other agencies and ministries. 

On December 1, 2010, Pope Benedict XVI accepted Hermann's letter of resignation as auxiliary bishop of the Archdiocese of St. Louis.

References

External links

 Roman Catholic Archdiocese of St. Louis Official Site
 Bishop Hermann's Archdiocesan Profile
 USCCB Bishops Directory

 

21st-century American Roman Catholic titular bishops
Roman Catholic Archdiocese of St. Louis
Living people
Saint Louis University alumni
Kenrick–Glennon Seminary alumni
1934 births
Religious leaders from Missouri